Tripoint is a science fiction novel  by the United States science fiction and fantasy author C. J. Cherryh,  first published by Warner Books in September 1994. It is one of Cherryh's Merchanter novels and is set in the author's Alliance-Union universe.

Plot summary
Twenty years in the past, merchanter ships Sprite and Corinthian were docked at Mariner Station. What started out as a friendly sleepover between the inexperienced Marie Hawkins of Sprite and Austin Bowe of Corinthian turned into rape, with Marie becoming pregnant. She elected to raise the child, Thomas Bowe-Hawkins, on Sprite, but was consumed with rage. Her brother was the senior captain of Sprite. Tom grew up with an ambivalent mother and was never fully accepted by his family. When Austin later became senior captain of Corinthian, Marie started tracking Corinthian's movements in order to expose what she suspected was smuggling.

When the two ships cross paths again, this time at Viking, Marie initiates her long-planned revenge. She and Tom scour the docks for information about Corinthians cargo, but Tom is caught snooping and is imprisoned aboard Corinthian, forcing the ship to depart prematurely for Pell Station via Tripoint.  At Marie's insistence, Sprite pursues. Aboard Corinthian, Tom meets Austin, his domineering father, and Capella, second chief navigator and night-walker.

When Corinthian docks at Pell Station, Tom's younger half-brother, Christian Bowe-Perrault, tries to solve the problem by shipping him off to Sol Station, but Tom escapes and hides on the docks. Christian and Capella search frantically for him, unaware that Sabrina Perrault-Cadiz, Christian's cousin, has already found and befriended him. When Capella contacts old acquaintances for assistance, it attracts the unwanted attention of a dissident faction within the outlawed Mazianni Fleet. Capella is an ex-Fleet navigator with knowledge of Fleet routes and drop-points, which the dissidents want.

When Corinthian prepares to depart for Tripoint, Tom returns voluntarily to the ship and is no longer treated as a prisoner. He learns the ship's secret: they are illegally trading with the renegade Fleet. Austin justifies this by maintaining that supplying the Fleet means it will not have to raid merchanter ships.

Sprite arrives at Pell Station shortly after Corinthians departure and takes off again in pursuit. During Corinthians jump to Tripoint, Capella is aware of Sprite and a Mazianni spotter following, and performs a premature system-drop near an abandoned freighter, causing the other ships to overshoot. Corinthian immediately starts frantically offloading to the freighter, a Fleet drop-point. As the spotter and Sprite approach, Tom and Christian activate the freighter's weapons and destroy the spotter.

Tom tells his mother he is staying with Corinthian because he is more at home on his father's ship than his mother's. Marie, having taken the captaincy of Sprite from her weak brother, does not expose Corinthian's illegal trade because of Tom and because Corinthian outguns Sprite. Austin realizes too many people know about his connection with the Fleet and decides to leave Alliance-Union space for good. As amends for the past, Austin offers Marie the access codes to the hulk at Tripoint and the opportunity to take over Corinthians profitable trade, but she declines and the ships part company.

During Corinthians next jump, Capella tells Tom about a new drop-point she discovered that leads to a habitable planet with forests. The Mazianni are building a new secret colony there and Corinthian is now part of that future.

Main characters
Merchanter ship Sprite
 Thomas Bowe-Hawkins – junior computer technician
 Marie Hawkins – cargo chief, Thomas' mother
 Mischa Hawkins – captain, Marie's brother
Merchanter ship Corinthian
 Christian Bowe-Perrault – officer, Thomas' half-brother
 Austin Bowe – captain, Thomas and Christian's father
 Beatrice Perrault – pilot, Christian's mother
 Sabrina Perrault-Cadiz – officer, Christian's cousin
 Capella – second chief navigator on loan to Corinthian from the Fleet

References
 Cherryh, C. J. Tripoint, Warner Aspect, 1994.

External links
 C. J. Cherryh's home page. Alliance/Union Chronology.
 .

American science fiction novels
1994 American novels
1994 science fiction novels
Science fiction novels by C. J. Cherryh
Military science fiction novels
Alliance–Union universe
Novels set in the future
Warner Books books